Meri Surat Teri Ankhen is a 1963 Bollywood drama film directed by R.K. Rakhan, starring Ashok Kumar, Asha Parekh and Pradeep Kumar. It is based on the Bengali novel Ulka by Nihar Ranjan Gupta.

Plot 
Raj Kumar, a wealthy businessman, dislikes everything he deems ugly. When his wife Kamla becomes pregnant and gives birth to a darkskinned son, he asks the doctor Mathur to tell Kamla that the child was stillborn. Mathur gives the child to the Muslim couple Rahmat and Naseeban, who raise him as their own son. The child, who is named Pyare, accidentally burns their dwelling down, and Naseeban becomes a casualty. Rahmat relocates to his village when he raises Pyare as a musician. Years later, Rahmat dies, but not before informing Pyare that he is actually a Hindu. Mathur tells Pyare about his true family, and arranges a song and dance play where Pyare will perform, hoping that Raj will overcome his dislike for his now grown-up son. His efforts fail as Raj instead offers to pay compensation so that Pyare can look after himself. Pyare goes to Raj to return the money, at which point Kamla sees him and asks him not to leave and adopts him as her son. Later, Raj's other son Sudhir is kidnapped and held for  ransom. Sudhir's fiancée Kavita inaccurately believes that Pyare is behind this abduction. Will misfortune and tragedy also follow Pyare to his new-found family?

Cast 
Ashok Kumar as Pyare
Asha Parekh as Kavita
Pradeep Kumar as Sudhir
Kanhaiyalal as Rahmat
Tapan Bose as Mathur
Achala Sachdev as Kamla
Ishwarlal as Raj Kumar

Production 
Meri Surat Teri Ankhen is based on the Bengali novel Ulka.

Soundtrack 
Singers: Mohammed Rafi, Manna Dey, Mukesh, Suman Kalyanpur, Asha Bhosle, Lata Mangeshkar
Music: S. D. BurmanLyricist''': Shailendra

References

External links 
 

1960s Hindi-language films
1963 films
Films scored by S. D. Burman
Films based on Indian novels
Films based on works by Nihar Ranjan Gupta